The Dukes of Swabia were the rulers of the Duchy of Swabia during the Middle Ages. Swabia was one of the five stem duchies of the medieval German kingdom, and its dukes were thus among the most powerful magnates of Germany. The most notable family to rule Swabia was the Hohenstaufen family, who held it, with a brief interruption, from 1079 until 1268. For much of this period, the Hohenstaufen were also Holy Roman Emperors. With the death of Conradin, the last Hohenstaufen duke, the duchy itself disintegrated, although King Rudolf I attempted to revive it for his Habsburg family in the late-13th century.

Dukes of Swabia (909–1268)

Early dukes

 Burchard I Hunfriding (d. 911), mentioned as  marchio (margrave) in 903 and dux (duke) in 909
 Erchanger Ahalolfing, dominant count in Alemannia after the execution of Burchard I, declared duke in 915, exiled September 916, executed January 917.
 Burchard II (917–926, Hunfriding), recognized Henry the Fowler as king of Germany in 919 and was recognized by Henry as Duke of Swabia in return.
 Hermann I (926–949, Conradine)
 Liudolf (950–954, Ottonian)
 Burchard III (954–973, Hunfriding)
 Otto I (973–982, Ottonian)

Conradines
 Conrad I (982–997)
 Hermann II (997–1003)
 Hermann III (1003–12)

House of Babenberg
 Ernest I (1012–15)
 Ernest II (1015–30)
 Hermann IV (1030–38)

Miscellaneous houses
 Henry I (1038–45, Salian), King of the Romans from 1039 and Holy Roman Emperor from 1046
 Otto II (1045–48, Ezzonen)
 Otto III (1048–57, Schweinfurt)
 Rudolf I (1057–79, Rheinfelden)
 Berthold I (1079–90, Rheinfelden)
 Berthold II (1092–98, Zähringen)

House of Hohenstaufen, 1079–1268

| Frederick I1079–1105|| ||1050son of Frederick of Büren and Hildegard of Egisheim-Dagsburg||Agnes of Germany108911 children|| 21 July 1105aged 54 or 55
|-
| Frederick II the One-Eyed1105–1147|| ||1090son of Frederick I and Agnes of Germany || Judith of Bavaria11212 childrenAgnes of Saarbrückenc.11322 children || 6 April 1147aged 56 or 57
|-
| Frederick III Barbarossa1147–1152|| ||1122son of Frederick II and Judith of Bavaria || Adelheid of Vohburg2 March 1147Egerno childrenBeatrice of Burgundy9 June 1156Würzburg12 children || 10 June 1190aged 67 or 68
|-
| Frederick IV1152–1167|| ||1145son of Conrad III of Germany and Gertrude von Sulzbach || Gertrude of Bavaria1166no children|| 19 August 1167Romeaged 21 or 22
|-
| Frederick V1167–1170||||16 July 1164Paviason of Frederick III and Beatrice of Burgundy ||unmarried|| 28 November 1170aged 6
|-
| Frederick VI1170–1191|| ||February 1167Modiglianason of Frederick III and Beatrice of Burgundy ||unmarried|| 20 January 1191Acreaged 24
|-
| Conrad II1191–1196|| ||February or March 1173son of Frederick III and Beatrice of Burgundy ||unmarried|| 15 August 1196Durlachaged 23
|-
| Philip1196–1208|| ||August 1177son of Frederick III and Beatrice of Burgundy ||Irene Angelina25 May 11974 children||21 June 1208Bambergaged 30
|-
|align="center" colspan="7"|Vacancy: 1208-1212
|-
| Frederick VII1212–1216||  ||26 December 1194Jesison of Henry I and Constance of Sicily||Constance of Aragon15 August 12091 childYolande of Jerusalem9 November 12252 childrenIsabella of England15 July 12354 children|| 13 December 1250Torremaggioreaged 55
|-
| Henry II1216–1235||  || 1211Sicilyson of Frederick I and Constance of Aragon ||Margaret29 November 12252 children|| 12 February 1242Martiranoaged 30
|-
| Conrad III1235–1254 ||  ||25 April 1228Andriason of Frederick I and Yolande of Jerusalem ||Elisabeth of Bavaria1 September 12461 child|| 21 May 1254Lavelloaged 26
|-
| Conrad IV the Younger1254–1268||  ||25 March 1252Wolfsteinson of Conrad I and Elisabeth of Bavaria ||never married||29 October 1268Naplesaged 16(executed)
|-
|}

House of Habsburg (1283–1309)
 Rudolf (1283–90)
 John (1290–1309)

Family tree

Successor states

In the 13th century, the Duchy of Swabia disintegrated into numerous smaller states. Some of the more important immediate successor states were:

During the following century, several of these states were acquired by the County of Württemberg or the Duchy of Austria, as marked above. In 1803 Bavarian Swabia was annexed by Bavaria and shortly afterwards became part of the Kingdom of Bavaria.

See also 
 Duchess of Swabia

References

 
History of Swabia